The Duchy of Pomerania-Neustettin, also known as the Duchy of Neustettin, and the Duchy of Szczecinek, was a feudal duchy of the Holy Roman Empire located in Middle Pomerania. It existed between 1372 and 1478. Its capital was Szczecinek. It was formed from the part of the territories Pomerania-Wolgast on 8 June 1368 and existed until 1390 when it was incorporated back into Pomerania-Wolgast. Its only ruler was Duke Wartislaw V of the House of Griffins.

History 
In 1365,  Barnim IV, duke and co-ruler of Pomerania-Wolgast had died. After his death, his part of the state was inherited by his sons, Wartislaw VI and Bogislaw VI. His brothers, Wartislaw V and Bogislaw V had gotten into an argument over the division of the duchy's lands. The dispute led to civil war, in which Wartislaw VI got supported by Wartislaw VI and Bogislaw VI, as well as by the dukes of Mecklenburg. Eventually, the emperor of the Holy Roman Empire, Charles IV, intervened in the war.

On 25 May 1368, the dukes agreed on a preliminary division of Pomerania-Wolgast, in which Wartislaw V received the Land of Neustettin, centred around the city of Neustettin (now Szczecinek, Poland), and formed the Duchy of Pomerania-Neustettin. The final division of the country was made on 8 June 1372. Wartislaw V ruled the country until his death in 1390. After his death, the duchy was incorporated back into Pomerania-Wolgast.

List of rulers 
 1368–1390: Wartislaw V

Notes

Reference

Bibliography 
 Rodowód książąt pomorskich by E. Rymar. Szczecin. Pomeranian Library. 2005. ISBN 83-87879-50-9, OCLC 69296056.

Former countries in Europe
Former monarchies of Europe
Former duchies
Duchies of the Holy Roman Empire
Neustettin
14th-century establishments in Europe
14th-century disestablishments in Europe
14th century in the Holy Roman Empire
States and territories established in 1368
States and territories disestablished in 1390